Owen Kinsella was an Irish footballer who played as a half back.

He joined Shamrock Rovers in 1930 from Fordsons. He left for St James's Gate F.C. in 1938 and in 1939 moved to Limerick F.C. .

Kinsella earned two international caps for the Irish Free State making his debut on 8 May 1932 in a 2–0 friendly win over the Netherlands in the Olympic Stadium (Amsterdam). His second cap came five years later in a World Cup qualifier defeat to Norway in the Ullevaal Stadion on the 10 October 1937.

Honours
Shamrock Rovers
 League of Ireland: 1931–32, 1937–38
 FAI Cup: 1931, 1932, 1933, 1936
 League of Ireland Shield: 1931–32, 1932–33, 1934–35, 1937–38
 Leinster Senior Cup: 1930, 1933

Sources 
The Hoops by Paul Doolan and Robert Goggins

Republic of Ireland association footballers
Association football midfielders
Republic of Ireland international footballers
Fordsons F.C. players
St James's Gate F.C. players
Shamrock Rovers F.C. players
Limerick F.C. players
League of Ireland players
Year of birth missing
Year of death missing